The Minnesota Wind Chill are a professional ultimate team based in Saint Paul, Minnesota. The Wind Chill are a member of the Central Division of the American Ultimate Disc League (AUDL). It is one of two teams in the AUDL to represent a state rather than a specific city.

Roster

2022 
Current Wind Chill Players for the 2022Season:

*Denotes captains

Management 
Ben Feldman - Coach
Omar Ansari - Owner
Ben Feldman - Owner/General Manager
Jim Mott - Owner

Results

2017

2016

2015

Team history

References

External links
 

Sports in Blaine, Minnesota
Ultimate (sport) teams
Sports teams in Minnesota
2013 establishments in Minnesota
Ultimate teams established in 2013